Counter may refer to:

Mathematics and computing
 Counter machine, a subclass of register machines
 Counter (digital), an electronic device, mechanical device, or computer program for counting
 Loop counter, the variable that controls the iterations of a loop
 Jeton, a reckoning counter used on reckoning boards for calculations
 Mechanical counter, a digital counter using mechanical components
 Tally counter, a mechanical counting device
 Web counter, a counter that counts the number of visits to a web page
 Project COUNTER, a standard for reporting usage statistics of electronic resources

Games and sport
 Counter (board wargames), a playing piece used in board wargames
 Counter run, an offensive play in American football
 Counter turn, an element in figure skating
 Counter (collectible card games), a small item used to represent certain objects or conditions in a collectible card game
 Jones Counter, measures distance bicycles travel

Linguistics and typography
 Counter (typography), an enclosed space in a letter-form
 Measure word, a type of word in some languages
 Japanese counter word

Other uses 
 Countertop, the flat surface of a counter
 Bar (counter), a type of counter used in bars for food serving
 Compter or counter, a small jail
 Counter, the part of a ship's stern above the waterline that extends beyond the rudder stock (see nautical terms)
 The Counter, a global hamburger restaurant chain
 Frequency counter, an electronic instrument for measuring frequency

People with the name
 Nick Counter (1940–2009), American film and television executive
 S. Allen Counter (1944–2017), American neuroscientist, polar explorer, and university administrator
 See also Caunter, an associated surname

See also
 
 
 Count (disambiguation)
 Counting token (disambiguation)
 Counterflow (disambiguation)
 Opposition (politics)